The Mississippi Choctaw Indian Federation is a now-defunct organization of Choctaws and a former rival governing body of the Mississippi Band of Choctaw Indians.  They opposed federal tribal recognition because of fears of dominance by the Bureau of Indian Affairs (BIA) and were never federally recognized.  Nevertheless, they were considered a legitimate parallel government.

History
The Federation was formed on September 27, 1934. 
Reverend Ed Willis was installed as the first recognized chief.    The group represented 400 Choctaw and had a functioning, written constitution.

The government disbanded after leaders were moved to another jurisdiction.

References

Choctaw
Native American history of Mississippi
Unrecognized tribes in the United States